The first season of the American television sitcom 2 Broke Girls, premiered on CBS from September 19, 2011, and concluded on May 7, 2012. The series was created and executively produced by Michael Patrick King and Whitney Cummings. The season introduces Max Black, a sarcastic below-the-poverty-line waitress, and Caroline Channing, a disgraced New York socialite turned waitress, who both pool their money together to pay for their future cupcake business. Kat Dennings and Beth Behrs portray the two lead characters of the series, Max Black and Caroline Channing. The main cast is rounded out by actors Garrett Morris, Jonathan Kite, Matthew Moy, and Jennifer Coolidge, who portray Earl, Oleg, Han Lee, and Sophie Kaczynski.

2 Broke Girls''' first season aired during the 2011–12 television season on Mondays at 8:30 p.m. EST, except the series premiere. While initial reviews were positive, the season garnered mixed reviews from television critics, who praised the lead actresses' chemistry while panning the use of stereotypes and racial content. The season premiere debuted to 19.37 million viewers, the highest series launch on CBS since Fall 2001. The season averaged 11.27 million viewers per 24 episodes. Season one earned several award nominations and won two awards: An Emmy Award for Outstanding Art Direction for a Multi-Camera Series and a People's Choice Award for Favorite New TV Comedy.

The entire season was released on DVD in Region 1 on September 4, 2012, Region 2 on October 22, 2012, and Region 4 on October 17, 2012.

Development and production
Creator Michael Patrick King had worked on several network series before the HBO television series Sex and the City (1998–2004). Initially starting out as a writer, he went on to direct and produce episodes for the series as well as write, produce and direct the two films that followed – Sex and the City and Sex and the City 2. After finalizing the last film to the series, King entered a multi-year deal with Warner Bros. Television, through which he formed his production company, Michael Patrick King Productions. In that year, a bidding war occurred for the undeveloped pilot to 2 Broke Girls. In December, the series' pilot was picked up by CBS. The series was then ordered on May 13, 2011, for the 2011-2012 primetime television season. The series received a full-season pickup on October 5, 2011. In March 2012, the series was renewed for a second season.

The season was produced by Michael Patrick King Productions and Warner Bros. Television and executive produced by creators Michael Patrick King and comedian Whitney Cummings. The season featured writing from King, Cummings, David Feeney, Liz Feldman, Sonny Lee, Dave Mallins, Jhoni Marchinko, Molly McAleer, comedian Morgan Murphy, Michelle Nader, and Patrick Walsh. Directors hired for the season were James Burrows, Scott Ellis, John Fortenberry, Thomas Kail, Julie Anne Robinson (serving as associate director), actor Fred Savage, actress Jean Sagal, and actor Ted Wass. Ellis and Wass directed a majority of the season's episodes. Feldman, Tim Kaiser, Lee and Walsh also served as the series' producers. Series writers Malins, Marchinko, and Nader, along with Laura Kightlinger, served as the series consulting producers. Cinematography for the series was headed by Chris La Fountaine, with  Gary Baum and Joseph W. Calloway directing photography for one episode each.

Cast and characters

The first season employed a cast a five main actors. Actresses Kat Dennings and Beth Behrs were the first to be cast in the series as Max Black, a sarcastic below-the-poverty-line waitress, and Caroline Channing, a former socialite who is bankrupt following her father's arrest for his involvement in a Ponzi scheme. Jonathan Kite, Garrett Morris and Matthew Moy were later cast as Oleg, a foreign hypersexed cook; Earl, a wise but hip elderly cashier; and Han, the Korean proprietor of the diner.

Season one introduced a few characters that recurred throughout the season as well as several guest stars. Jennifer Coolidge portrayed Sophie Kaczynski, a Polish cleaning businesswoman who moves into the building where Max and Caroline live, beginning in the episode "And the Upstairs Neighbor". She was later upgraded to series regular in the next season. Nick Zano portrayed Johnny, a street artist and Max's potential love interest. Brooke Lyons played Peaches Landis, a wealthy clueless mother who hires Max as her babysitter of her twins. Marsha Thomason appeared in the season as Johnny's British girlfriend and Max's romantic rival Cashandra. Brian Gross and Greg Worswick appeared in two episodes of the season as a gay couple Steven and Michael. Noah Mills played Robbie, Max's ex-boyfriend in two episodes. Businesswoman Martha Stewart appeared in the season finale as herself. Jayson Blair, who starred in the MTV series The Hard Times of RJ Berger, starred in "And the Spring Break" as Brendon, a tenant in the apartment that Max and Caroline are housesitting for. Stand-up comedian Eddie Pepitone appeared in "And Hoarder Culture" as the voice of the hoarder that Max and Caroline help out.

Reception

Viewership and ratings
The pilot for 2 Broke Girls premiered in the United States on September 19, 2011 to 19.37 million viewers. The series premiere followed the season nine premiere of Two and a Half Men with Ashton Kutcher replacing Charlie Sheen, which premiered to 28 million viewers. The series premiere was the highest rated comedy series launch since fall 2001. The season ended with a 2 part episode "And Martha Stewart Have a Ball", which drew in 8.99 million viewers. The season averaged 11.29 million viewers per 24 episode, ranking  32 among the most watched primetime television series. The season also averaged 5.56 million viewers per 24 episodes within the target demographic, registering a 4.35/11 Nielsen ratings share and ranking as the eleventh highest rated program of the 2011-2012 primetime television season.

Critical reviews
The first season was well received by media critics. At Metacritic, a site which assigns a normalized rating out of 100 to reviews from media critics, the season received an average score of 66, indicating "generally favorable reviews", based on initial reviews of the pilot episode. Reviews of the full season became more polarized, with the criticism towards the show's usage of racial stereotypes.

Matt Hinrichs from DVD Talk wrote that the season release is "highly recommended." He deemed the first season "a snarky delight that crackles with hilarious situations and proudly non-p.c. characters." Hinrichs also praised actresses Dennings and Behrs for their portrayal of Max and Caroline, highlighting the chemistry between them and the characters themselves as the series' "winning formula." The Numbers writer C.S. Strowbridge positively received the season, praising the chemistry between the two leads and the character development of several of the main characters while noting that "calling it crass would be an understatement." Strowbridge concluded, "the style of humor will turn off as many people as it entertains and that is an issue. I do think Season One got better as it went along and even though the DVD and the Blu-ray do not have a lot of extras, it is still worth picking up." Todd Fuller of Sitcoms Online wrote that the series is "an old fashioned sitcom like Laverne & Shirley and Alice. It works on many levels. The writing is a bit edgy and raunchy at times, but that's the trend in many comedies these days. Kat Dennings and Beth Behrs have great chemistry and comic timing together. The supporting cast at the diner is pretty funny in small doses. Jennifer Coolidge was also a welcome later addition to the cast."

Emily Nussbaum of The New Yorker wrote a mixed review of the series. Favoring it over Cumming's series on NBC, Nussbaum praised the character Max as something new for network television, highlighting her sense of humor and her contrasting nature to that of Whitney's lead character. However, she was critical of the racial strereotypes present in the series and the series' setting. Nussbaum positively concluded, "there's so much potential here it kills me—a deep female friendship, raw humor about class, and a show that puts young women's sexuality dead center, rather than using it as visual spice, as in some cable series about bad-boy antiheroes." The A.V. Club writer Emily VanDerWerff, in her review of the series finale, was critical of the series for not living up to the potential present in the series' pilot episode and noted that "still hasn't figured out how to use the ensemble, though at least it doesn't seem to have something out for all of the male supporting characters." Patrick Bromley of DVD Verdict praised the lead actresses' chemistry but ultimately found it "repetitive, broad, grating and, more often than not, just stupid." Browley was also critical  of the racial content and stereotypes present in the series. Aaron Peck, writing for High-Def Digest, wrote the first season release as "one to avoid." Deeming the season "pure comedic blasphemy", Peck panned the comedic content and use of stereotyping and racism, deeming the characters alongside Max and Caroline "the most racially insensitive depictions" thought up.

Awards and nominations
In 2012, the series won the People's Choice Award for Favorite New TV Comedy. Crew members Glenda Rovello, Conny Boettger and Amy Feldman were nominated for Excellence in Production Design Award for Episode of a Multi-Camera, Variety, or Unscripted Series for the work on the episode And the Rich People Problems". At the 2012 Teen Choice Awards, 2 Broke Girls'' was nominated for Choice TV: Comedy while series star Beth Behrs was nominated for Choice TV Breakout Performance – Female. At the 65th Primetime Emmy Awards, Rovello and Feldman won the award for Outstanding Art Direction for a Multi-Camera Series while cinematographer Gary Baum was nominated for Outstanding Cinematography for a Multi-Camera Series and series editor Darryl Bates for Outstanding Multi-Camera Picture Editing for a Comedy Series.

Episodes

Ratings

United States ratings

United Kingdom ratings
All viewing figures and ranks are sourced from BARB.

Australian ratings

DVD release
The DVD boxset and  Blu-ray for season one was released by Warner Home Video on September 4, 2012 in the United States. The set contains three discs, each with eight episodes, unaired scenes and a featurette titled "2 Girls Going for Broke". The featurette contains behind the scenes material with the cast and creators. The DVD set and Blu-ray was released in Region 2 on October 17, 2012 while in Region 4, the DVD set was released on October 22, 2012.

References

2011 American television seasons
2012 American television seasons